Sir Anand Satyanand,  (born 22 July 1944) is a former lawyer, judge and ombudsman who served as the 19th Governor-General of New Zealand from 2006 to 2011. 

Satyanand was chair of the Commonwealth Foundation for two 2-year terms, ending in December 2016. He then chaired the Commonwealth Observation Group of the National Elections of the Independent State of Papua New Guinea in 2017. In 2018, the New Zealand Government appointed him to lead the Royal Commission of Inquiry into Historical Abuse in State care and in the care of Faith-based Institutions, which is scheduled to continue until 2023. In November 2019, at the conclusion of its build-up phase, he is to step down as chair. In August 2019 he was elected to be Chancellor of the University of Waikato for a 4-year term.

Early life and family

Anand Satyanand was born on 22 July 1944 and raised in Auckland to an Indo-Fijian family. His grandparents arrived in Fiji from India in 1911, and his grandfather worked as a government interpreter. His father, Mutyala Satyanand, was born in Sigatoka in 1913 and arrived in New Zealand in 1927 to attend high school and later university. His mother Tara Tillak was from Suva, and trained as a Karitane nurse in New Zealand. She married Mutyala Satyanand in 1940, after moving to New Zealand.

Satyanand attended Sacred Heart College in Auckland, and then undertook the medical intermediate course at the University of Otago in Dunedin. He was not successful in gaining entry to the medical school and later said "in reality I did not do well enough ... (but) ... Looking back over that year, I remembered that one of the things I had really enjoyed was the debating and forum meetings involving students." So instead he turned to law studies, working part-time as a law clerk in Auckland. He worked at Westfield Freezing Works to help fund his studies and developed a friendship with David Lange who also worked there at the same time. He graduated with a Bachelor of Laws from the University of Auckland in 1970. He worked as a lawyer for the next 12 years, some of that with the Crown Solicitor's firm and then as a Partner with the legal firm Shieff Angland. His legal work centred on criminal law and revenue law. He served on the Council of the Auckland District Law Society from 1979 until his appointment as a Judge of the District Court of New Zealand in 1982.

During the 1966 general election, Satyanand helped Clive Edwards (later Tongan Deputy Prime Minister) when he stood in Auckland Central for National. Later, in the 1975 general election, Satyanand and his wife helped David Lange in his first, unsuccessful attempt at election (for Labour, in the seat of Hobson).

In 1995 Satyanand was appointed an Ombudsman, and he served two 5-year terms. Between 2005 and his appointment as governor-general he chaired the Confidential Forum for Former In-Patients of Psychiatric Hospitals, reviewed the Banking Ombudsman scheme, and installed the Pecuniary Interests Register and Scheme for Members of Parliament.

Satyanand has been married to Susan Sharpe since 1970. She was born in Sydney, Australia, in 1947 and moved to New Zealand with her family in 1955. Susan and Anand have three adult children. Satyanand's daughter Anya is an advocate of gay marriage, being in a civil union with her partner Ange. In 2002, Satyanand and his wife were involved in a serious car accident in Dome Valley north of Warkworth, Northland, where an oncoming car crossed the centre line and crashed head-on into their car. Both were injured, and Satyanand suffered serious spinal injury; he broke his C2 and C3 vertebrae, and had to wear a halo traction to keep his head straight.

As well as English, Satyanand also speaks some Fijian, Telugu, Hindi patois, and Māori.

Governor-General of New Zealand
In 2006, Satyanand was appointed Governor-General by Queen Elizabeth II on the advice of the New Zealand government under Prime Minister Helen Clark. He succeeded Dame Silvia Cartwright as governor-general on 23 August 2006. His appointment was welcomed by every parliamentary party leader. He was the first governor-general of Indian descent and the first Roman Catholic governor-general.

Prince Richard, Duke of Gloucester, Grand Prior of the Order of St John, received Satyanand as governor-general designate on 7 July 2006 and invested him as a Knight of Justice of the Most Venerable Order of the Hospital of St John of Jerusalem.

In May 2007 changes were made to the Queen's Service Order. Under the previous Royal Warrant, the governor-general was ex-officio Principal Companion of the Order but was not a member of the Order. The Royal Warrant now provides for the appointment of the governor-general as a Companion of the Order in their own right.

The first bill to which Satyanand granted Royal Assent was the Coroners Bill.

Starting on New Year's Day 2009, Satyanand issued a "New Year's Message" intended to highlight "issues New Zealanders might consider as they looked to the future".

Satyanand was the first governor-general not to hold a knighthood before entering office (Colonel Thomas Gore Browne, Governor of New Zealand 1855–1861, was knighted in office). However, following the changes to the New Zealand honours system announced by Prime Minister John Key on 8 March 2009, the Queen approved Satyanand's redesignation from a Principal Companion in the New Zealand Order of Merit (PCNZM) to a Knight Grand Companion of that Order (GNZM) on 27 March 2009.

On assuming the role of governor-general, Satyanand received the style The Honourable for life; in 2010, he was advanced to the style of The Right Honourable. This style was accorded for life to all future governors-general, prime ministers, chief justices, and Speakers of Parliament.

Satyanand completed his term of office as governor-general on 23 August 2011.

Finances
The New Zealand Government pays for the costs associated with the Queen's representative, the governor-general, in their exercising of the powers of the Crown on behalf of the Queen, including travel, security, residences, offices, ceremonial occasions. In the 2010 Budget, the total cost of supporting the governor-general was $3,591,000 for Support Services and Maintenance of the residences, $1,710,000 for Depreciation Expenses on Government Houses, $1,279,000 Remuneration and Travel and an estimated $1,680,000 for Policy Advice and Co-ordination; a total of $7,610,000 and $11 million on capital investment in Government House, Wellington, principally used for its conservation, a total of over $18 million.

Fijian coup talks
On 30 November 2006, Satyanand hosted a meeting between the Prime Minister of Fiji, Laisenia Qarase, and Fiji's military commander, Commodore Frank Bainimarama, at Government House in Wellington in an attempt to resolve the escalating crisis in Fiji. Although he hosted the meeting, he did not take part in the discussions, which were chaired by New Zealand's then Foreign Minister, Winston Peters. This was the last serious effort by the international community to avert a military coup, which followed on 5 December.

Public transport in Auckland
At the opening of the new New Lynn Train Station on 25 September 2010, Satyanand stated heavy investment in motorways and the decline of public transport after trams were taken off the roads in the 1950s had led to severe congestion to the detriment of both individuals and the economy.

Paul Henry controversy
On 5 October 2010, TVNZ Breakfast show host Paul Henry questioned whether Satyanand was "even a New Zealander". He then repeated the question, saying of Satyanand's replacement, "Are you going to choose a New Zealander who looks and sounds like a New Zealander this time ... are we going to go for someone who is more like a New Zealander this time?" Henry attracted criticism from both sides of politics and New Zealand's race relations commissioner Joris de Bres. Henry later apologised, was suspended, and then resigned from TVNZ.

Subsequent roles
Since returning to private life, Satyanand and his wife have remained in Wellington. He was Chair of the Commonwealth Foundation for two 2-year terms, ending in December 2016. He then led the Commonwealth team in observing the National Elections of the Independent State of Papua New Guinea. He maintains active interests in several organisations, including as President of the NZ Institute of International Affairs, as a member of Transparency International's Anti-Corruption Council and as Patron of New Zealand Rugby League and of Commonwealth Youth New Zealand. He is a Distinguished Fellow at the University of Auckland Law School, visiting on a monthly basis. Susan and Anand are both active members of the Rotary Club of Wellington; both have been made Paul Harris Fellows, and Satyanand received the Rotary International Award of Honour in 2011.

Styles and honours

His Honour Judge Anand Satyanand (1982 – 5 June 2005)
His Honour Judge Anand Satyanand, DCNZM (6 June 2005 – 4 June 2006) 
His Honour Judge Anand Satyanand, PCNZM (5 June 2006 – 22 August 2006)
His Excellency The Honourable Anand Satyanand, PCNZM, Governor-General of New Zealand (23 August 2006 – 20 May 2007)
His Excellency The Honourable Anand Satyanand, PCNZM, QSO, Governor-General of New Zealand (21 May 2007 – 26 March 2009)
His Excellency The Honourable Sir Anand Satyanand, GNZM, QSO, Governor-General of New Zealand (27 March 2009 – 2 August 2010)
His Excellency The Right Honourable Sir Anand Satyanand, GNZM, QSO, Governor-General of New Zealand (3 August 2010 – 23 August 2011)
The Right Honourable Sir Anand Satyanand, GNZM, QSO (24 August 2011 – Present)

References

Further reading

External links

Government House, Wellington biography
2006 Birthday Honours List at Government House, Wellington

1944 births
Living people
New Zealand people of Indo-Fijian descent
District Court of New Zealand judges
People educated at Sacred Heart College, Auckland
Governors-General of New Zealand
20th-century New Zealand judges
New Zealand Roman Catholics
Ombudsmen in New Zealand
University of Auckland alumni
Companions of the Queen's Service Order
Knights Grand Companion of the New Zealand Order of Merit
Knights of Justice of the Order of St John
21st-century New Zealand politicians
Recipients of Pravasi Bharatiya Samman